Sakshi Malik is an Indian actress, fitness influencer and model, known for her role in the film Sonu Ke Titu Ki Sweety and its associated song, "Bom Diggy Diggy".

Early life 
Sakshi was born in Kanpur, Uttar Pradesh. She completed her Bachelor of Technology at the Jaypee Institute of Information Technology, Noida. During college, she started to appear in fashion shows.

Career 
After graduation, Malik moved to Mumbai and started modelling for television commercials of brands, including Nykaa and PC Jeweller. In 2018, she made her debut in Bollywood by acting in the film Sonu Ke Titu Ki Sweety. Her song from the film, "Bom Diggy Diggy", became popular on the Internet in India. She was also in the music video for Armaan Malik's single "Veham".

Her photo was used as a commercial sex worker in the 2020 Telugu movie V, for which she approached the Bombay High Court. In March 2021, the High Court ordered Amazon Prime to take down the movie because use of her photo "without consent is prima facie impermissible, unlawful and entirely illegal"; the movie was promptly removed from the platform. The producers and the actor settled their disputes after a month.

Filmography

FIlms

Music Videos

References

External links 

 
 

Year of birth missing (living people)
Living people
21st-century Indian actresses
Jaypee Institute of Information Technology alumni
People from Kanpur